Erika Larregui Nagel (born 12 March 1972) is a Mexican politician from the Ecologist Green Party of Mexico. From 2006 to 2009 she served as Deputy of the LX Legislature of the Mexican Congress representing Sinaloa.

References

1972 births
Living people
People from Sinaloa
Women members of the Chamber of Deputies (Mexico)
Ecologist Green Party of Mexico politicians
21st-century Mexican politicians
21st-century Mexican women politicians
Deputies of the LX Legislature of Mexico
Members of the Chamber of Deputies (Mexico) for Sinaloa